The 1969 Cal State Hayward Pioneers football team represented California State College at Hayward—now known California State University, East Bay—as a member of the Far Western Conference (FWC) during the 1969 NCAA College Division football season. Led by fourth-year head coach Les Davis, Cal State Hayward compiled an overall record of 9–1 with a mark of 5–0 in conference play, winning the FWC title for the program's first conference championship. The team was outscored by its opponents 262 to 165 for the season. The Pioneers played home games at Pioneer Stadium in Hayward, California.

The 1969 team was the most successful in the 29 years of Cal State Hayward football, which competed from 1965 to 1993. They defeated two teams ranked in the top 20 of the NCAA College Division rankings and finished the season ranked 15th in the UPI Small College poll. 1969 Pioneers had the most wins, nine, and fewest losses, one, of any team in program history. It was the only season in which was team was undefeated in the conference and won the conference championship outright.

Schedule

References

Cal State Hayward
Cal State Hayward Pioneers football seasons
Northern California Athletic Conference football champion seasons
Cal State Hayward Pioneers football